John Sinclair (born October 2, 1941) is an American poet, writer, and political activist from Flint, Michigan. Sinclair's defining style is jazz poetry, and he has released most of his works in audio formats. Most of his pieces include musical accompaniment, usually by a varying group of collaborators dubbed Blues Scholars.

As an emerging young poet in the mid-1960s, Sinclair took on the role of manager for the Detroit rock band MC5. The band's politically charged music and its Yippie core audience dovetailed with Sinclair's own radical development. In 1968, while still working with the band, he conspicuously served as a founding member of the White Panther Party, a militantly anti-racist socialist group and counterpart of the Black Panthers.

Arrested for possession of marijuana in 1969, Sinclair was given ten years in prison. The sentence was criticized by many as unduly harsh, and it galvanized a noisy protest movement led by prominent figures of the 1960s counterculture. Sinclair was freed in December 1971, but he remained in litigation – his case against the government for illegal domestic surveillance was successfully pleaded to the US Supreme Court in United States v. U.S. District Court (1972).

Sinclair eventually left the US and took up residency in Amsterdam. He continues to write and record and, since 2005, has hosted a regular radio program, The John Sinclair Radio Show, as well as produced a line-up of other shows on his own radio station, Radio Free Amsterdam.

Sinclair was among the first people to purchase recreational marijuana when it became legal in Michigan on December 1, 2019.

Early life and education
Sinclair was a member of the Class of 1960 at Albion College in Albion, Michigan, but he dropped out after his first year. Sinclair subsequently attended the Flint College of the University of Michigan, now the University of Michigan-Flint. During his time at UM-Flint he served on the university's Publications Board, school newspaper The Word, and was the president of the Cinema Guild. He graduated in 1964.

1960s activism
Born in Flint, Michigan, Sinclair was involved in the reorganization of the Detroit underground newspaper, Fifth Estate, during the paper's growth in the late 1960s.  Fifth Estate continues to publish to this day, making it one of the longest continuously published alternative periodicals in the United States.

Sinclair also contributed to the formation of Detroit Artists Workshop Press, which published five issues of Work Magazine. Sinclair worked as a jazz writer for Down Beat from 1964 to 1965, being an outspoken advocate for the newly emerging Free Jazz Avant Garde movement.  Sinclair was one of the "New Poets" who read at the seminal Berkeley Poetry Conference in July 1965.

In April 1967 he founded the Ann Arbor Sun, a biweekly underground newspaper, with his wife Leni Sinclair and artist Gary Grimshaw.

Involvement with the MC5

Sinclair managed the proto-punk-band MC5 from 1966 through 1969. Under his guidance the band embraced the counter-culture revolutionary politics of the White Panther Party, founded in answer to the Black Panthers' call for white people to support their movement. 

During this period, Sinclair booked "The Five" as the regular house band at Detroit's famed Grande Ballroom in what came to be known as the "Kick out the Jams" shows. He was managing the MC5 at the time of their free concert outside the 1968 Democratic National Convention in Chicago. The band was the only group to perform before police broke up the massive anti-Vietnam war rally as part of an organized police riot. Eventually, the MC5 came to find Sinclair's politics too heavy-handed.  He and the band separated in 1969 In 2006, Sinclair joined MC5 bassist Michael Davis to launch the Music Is Revolution Foundation, serving as a general board member.

Imprisonment and public support
After a series of convictions for possession of marijuana, Sinclair was sentenced to ten years in prison in 1969 after offering two joints to an undercover female narcotics officer.

The severity of his sentence sparked high-profile protests, including an infamous incident at the 1969 Woodstock Festival wherein Yippie activist Abbie Hoffman jumped on the stage and seized a microphone during a performance by The Who. Hoffman managed to shout only a few  words about Sinclair's plight before he was forcibly ejected from the stage by guitarist Pete Townshend.

With a more successful protest, John Lennon performed his new song "John Sinclair" on television and recorded it for his next album, Some Time in New York City (1972), though by that time Sinclair had been released. With "directness and simplicity", said one critic, the lyrics lament Sinclair's intended harsh punishment: "They gave him ten for two – what else can the bastards do?"

Various public and private protests culminated in the "John Sinclair Freedom Rally" at Ann Arbor's Crisler Arena in December 1971. The event brought together celebrities including Lennon and Yoko Ono; musicians David Peel, Stevie Wonder, Phil Ochs and Bob Seger, Archie Shepp and Roswell Rudd; poets Allen Ginsberg and Ed Sanders; and countercultural speakers including Abbie Hoffman, Rennie Davis, David Dellinger, Jerry Rubin, and Bobby Seale. Three days after the rally, Sinclair was released from prison when the Michigan Supreme Court ruled that the state's marijuana statutes were unconstitutional. These events inspired the creation of Ann Arbor's annual pro-legalization Hash Bash rally.

In 1972, Leonard Weinglass took on the defense of Sinclair in Detroit, Michigan after he was charged with conspiracy to destroy government property along with Larry 'Pun' Plamondon and John Forrest. The case became United States v. U.S. District Court, 407 U.S. 297 (1972), on appeal to the United States Supreme Court. The Court rendered a landmark decision prohibiting the US government's use of domestic electronic surveillance without a warrant, freeing Sinclair and his co-defendants.

Writing, performances, and poetry
Sinclair has been writing a newspaper column on cannabis, "Free the Weed," since the mid-1980s. The primary focus of Sinclair's column has been the social history of cannabis use in the US; however, he often touches upon the global campaign for its legalisation.

Since the mid-1990s Sinclair has performed and recorded his spoken word pieces with his band The Blues Scholars, which has included such musicians as Wayne Kramer, Brock Avery, Charles Moore, Doug Lunn, and Paul Ill, among many others. He also performed as a distinctive disc jockey for New Orleans' WWOZ Radio, the public jazz and heritage station.

On March 22, 2006, Sinclair joined The Black Crowes on stage at the Paradiso in Amsterdam, and read his poem "Monk in Orbit" during the instrumental break in the song "Nonfiction". Two days later, he went back onstage at the Black Crowes show in the Paradiso, reading his poem "Fat Boy" during the long instrumental jam following the Black Crowes' song, "How Much for Your Wings?".

On January 20, 2009, to mark Barack Obama's inauguration as the 44th President of the United States, Sinclair performed a series of his poems accompanied by a live band, featuring Elliott Levin, Tony Bianco and Jair-Rohm Parker Wells at Cafe OTO in Dalston, East London.

In 2011, Sinclair recorded spoken-word for the intro to the song “Best Lasts Forever” by Scottish band The View (band), produced by Youth (musician).

The John Sinclair Foundation

Created in 2004, The John Sinclair Foundation is a non-profit organization based out of Amsterdam, Netherlands. Its mission is to ensure the preservation and proper presentation of the creative works via in poetry, music, performance, journalism, editing and publishing, broadcast and record production of John Sinclair. To date, the foundation has produced books, zines, records, and documentaries highlighting John Sinclair's contribution to the historic cannabis legalization effort, rock music in Detroit, and psychedelic communitarianism.

Discography
John Sinclair has recorded several of his poems and essays. On these albums blues and jazz musicians provide psychedelic soundscapes to accompany his delivery:

01 John Sinclair: thelonious: a book of monk (1996) – New Alliance Records
02 John Sinclair & His Blues Scholars: Full Moon Night [live] (1994) – Alive/Total Energy Records 
03 John Sinclair with Ed Moss Society Jazz Orchestra: If I Could Be With You [live] (1996) – SchoolKids Records
04 John Sinclair & His Blues Scholars: Full Circle (1997) – Alive Records [Choice Studio Album] 
05 John Sinclair & His Blues Scholars: White Buffalo Prayer [live] (2000) – SpyBoy Records
06 John Sinclair: Underground Issues [compilations] (2000) – SpyBoy Records
07 John Sinclair & His Boston Blues Scholars: Steady Rollin' Man Live [live] (2001) – triPup Records
[BOX-1] John Sinclair & His Blues Scholars: Fattening Frogs For Snakes, Volume One: The Delta Sound (2002) – Okra-Tone Records/Rooster Blues 
08 John Sinclair: KnockOut (2002) – D-Men Records
09 John Sinclair & Monster Island: PeyoteMind (2002) – Future Is Now Records
10 John Sinclair: It's All Good [compilation] (2005) – Big Chief Records 
11 John Sinclair: No Money Down: Greatest Hits, Volume 1 [compilation] (2005) – Big Chief Records
12 John Sinclair & Mark Ritsema: criss cross (2005) – Big Chief Records [Choice Studio Album] 
[BOX-2] John Sinclair: Fattening Frogs For Snakes, Volume Two: Country Blues (2005) – No Cover Records
13 John Sinclair: Guitar Army (2007)- Process Media [Album Inserted In Printing Of Book] 
14 John Sinclair & Pinkeye: Tearing Down the Shrine of Truth & Beauty [live] (2008) – LocoGnosis Records
15 John Sinclair & His Motor City Blues Scholars: Detroit Life (2008)- No Cover Records [A Choice Studio Album] 
[BOX-3] John Sinclair & His Blues Scholars: Fattening Frogs For Snakes, Volume Three: Don't Start Me To Talking (2009) – Big Chief Records
16 John Sinclair & Planet D Nonet: Viper Madness (2010) – No Cover Records [A Choice Studio Album] 
17 John Sinclair: It's All Good: A John Sinclair Reader (2010) – No Cover Records 
18 John Sinclair & His International Blues Scholars: Let's Go Get 'Em (2011) – No Cover Records [A Choice Studio Album] 
19 John Sinclair & Hollow Bones: Honoring The Local Gods [live] (2011) – Straw2Gold Records
20 John Sinclair: Song of Praise — Homage to John Coltrane [live] (2011) – Trembling Pillow Press 
21 John Sinclair: Beatnik Youth (2012) – Track Records [Choice Studio Album]
22 John Sinclair: Conspiracy Theory [compilation] (2012) – Big Chief Records
23 John Sinclair: Viperism [compilation] (2012) – Big Chief Records
[BOX-4] John Sinclair & His Blues Scholars: Fattening Frogs For Snakes, Volume Four: Natural From Our Hearts (unissued)
24 John Sinclair: Mohawk (2014) – Iron Man Records
25 John Sinclair: Beatnik Youth Ambient (2017) – Iron Man Records
26 John Sinclair: Mobile Homeland (2017) - Jett Plastic Recordings/Funky D Records
27 John Sinclair: Beatnik Youth (2017) – Iron Man Records

References

External links

Radio Free Amsterdam DJ Schedule 2018 | JohnSinclair.USThe John Sinclair Radio Show] at Radio Free Amsterdam
"Marijuana Revolution", a 1971 essay by John Sinclair
Interview with John Sinclair at Woodstock Story
Interview with John Sinclair at Stay Thirsty
The John and Leni Sinclair Papers, 1957-1999 at the Bentley Historical Library, University of Michigan
Twenty to Life: The Life & Times of John Sinclair (film 2004) on IMDb
 Interview with John Sinclair by Stephen McKiernan, Binghamton University Libraries Center for the Study of the 1960s, August 17, 2017

1941 births
Living people
People from Flint, Michigan
Writers from Flint, Michigan
20th-century American poets
21st-century American poets
Poets from Michigan
University of Michigan–Flint alumni
American people convicted of drug offenses
Yippies
American cannabis activists
American expatriates in the Netherlands
Albion College alumni